Kingston Methodist Church is a historic church in Kingston, Mississippi.

It was built in 1856 in a Greek Revival style. The building was added to the National Register of Historic Places in 1982.

References

Methodist churches in Mississippi
Churches on the National Register of Historic Places in Mississippi
Greek Revival church buildings in Mississippi
Churches completed in 1856
19th-century Methodist church buildings in the United States
National Register of Historic Places in Natchez, Mississippi